Vidar Sundstøl (born 30 June 1963) is a Norwegian crime fiction writer.

He made his literary debut in 2005, with the novel Kommandolinjer. Further novels are  I Alexandria from 2006 and Tingene hennes from 2007. He was awarded the Riverton Prize for the novel Drømmenes land from 2008.

Bibliography 
 Kommandolinjer (2005)
 I Alexandria (2006)
 Tingene hennes (2007)
 Drømmenes land (2008)
 De døde (2009)
 Ravnene (2011)
 Besettelsen (2013)
 Djevelens giftering (2015)
 Hullet han krøp ut av(2019)
 Oseberg (2020)

References

1963 births
Living people
People from Drangedal
Norwegian male novelists
Norwegian crime fiction writers
21st-century Norwegian novelists
21st-century Norwegian male writers